Crazy Desire (originally titled as La voglia matta, also known as The Crazy Urge) is a 1962 Italian comedy film directed by Luciano Salce. It launched the film career of Catherine Spaak. The film initially was banned by the Italian censors and then cut in some parts and released with a ban for persons under 14 years.

Plot
Antonio Berlinghieri (Ugo Tognazzi) is a 39-year-old engineer and father travelling on a highway one summer in his sports car when he sees a broken-down car with a group of teenagers. He stops to help them but soon discovers that the young men have a frivolous attitude. At first, he thinks of leaving to continue his trip but then notices the beauty of Francesca (Catherine Spaak), a fifteen-year-old girl. He decides to remain with the group to try to seduce or marry the girl, despite the difference in age.

Cast 
 Ugo Tognazzi as Ing. Antonio Berlinghieri
 Catherine Spaak as Francesca
 Gianni Garko as Piero
 Fabrizio Capucci as Enrico, Francesca's friend
 Luciano Salce as Bisigato
 Franco Giacobini as Carlo Alberghetti
 Béatrice Altariba as Silvana 
 Jimmy Fontana as Jimmy

References

External links

1962 films
Films directed by Luciano Salce
Films scored by Ennio Morricone
1960s coming-of-age comedy films
Italian coming-of-age comedy films
Films set in Rome
1962 comedy films
1960s Italian films